The M&I Bank Border Showdown Series is the official name for the Border War rivalry between the University of Kansas Jayhawks and the University of Missouri Tigers.

Competition format
 Team placing the highest in Big 12 Conference or NCAA Championship events will be awarded the points.
 If a contest is cancelled in any way and not rescheduled, the point(s) for that contest will be eliminated. If the event is rescheduled, the point(s) will apply.
 Post-Season Bonus points are only applied if both Kansas and Missouri are competing.
 If two teams tie in any event, the points for that event will be split between the two schools.
 Tie-Breaker: If schools tie in final total, following tie-breaker will be put into place: The school who was victorious in a majority of the head-to-head regular-season games will be declared the Border Showdown Champion. (Sports included: Volleyball, Soccer, Football, Men's and Women's Basketball, Baseball, Softball - 13 total games eligible).

History
The M&I Bank Border Showdown Series dates back to 2002. Missouri currently has an advantage in the series with a 7-2 lead in titles. Missouri leads the all-time series with a 208-149 point advantage as of the end of the 2010-2011 school year.

2002–2003
Kansas victories are shaded ██ blue. Missouri victories shaded in ██ gold.

2003–2004
Kansas victories are shaded ██ blue. Missouri victories shaded in ██ gold.

2004–2005
Kansas victories are shaded ██ blue. Missouri victories shaded in ██ gold.

2005–2006
Kansas victories are shaded ██ blue. Missouri victories shaded in ██ gold.

Source:

2006–2007
Kansas victories are shaded ██ blue. Missouri victories shaded in ██ gold.

2007–2008
Kansas victories are shaded ██ blue. Missouri victories shaded in ██ gold.

2008–2009
Kansas victories are shaded ██ blue. Missouri victories shaded in ██ gold.

2009–2010
Kansas victories are shaded ██ blue. Missouri victories shaded in ██ gold.

2010–2011
Kansas victories are shaded ██ blue. Missouri victories shaded in ██ gold.

2011–2012
Kansas victories are shaded ██ blue. Missouri victories shaded in ██ gold.

External links
https://web.archive.org/web/20080214120019/http://mutigers.cstv.com/ot/border-showdown.html
https://web.archive.org/web/20090412071427/http://www.kuathletics.com/trads/kan-border-showdown.html

References

College sports rivalries in the United States